Laurids Peter Worslund Kjær (26 February 1852 – 24 August 1932) was a Danish sports shooter. He competed in five events at the 1900 Summer Olympics.

References

External links
 

1852 births
1932 deaths
Danish male sport shooters
Olympic shooters of Denmark
Shooters at the 1900 Summer Olympics
People from Ikast-Brande Municipality
Sportspeople from the Central Denmark Region